Edwin Corning (September 30, 1883 – August 7, 1934) was an American businessman and politician from New York. He was Lieutenant Governor of New York from 1927 to 1928.

Early life
Corning was born on September 30, 1883, in Albany, New York. He was a son of Erastus Corning (1827–1897) and Mary (née Parker) Corning (1845–1899). His brother, Parker Corning served as a member of the United States House of Representatives.

Both of his grandfathers, Erastus Corning and Amasa J. Parker, served in Congress, and Parker was also a justice of the New York Supreme Court and founder of Albany Law School.

He was educated at The Albany Academy and the Groton School, and graduated from Yale University in 1906.

Career
After graduating from Yale, Corning served as an executive at the Ludlum Steel Company in Watervliet, New York, and became its president in 1910. He was also an officer of the Albany Felt Company, and served on the board of directors of several Albany banks.  Corning was also a gentleman farmer, and bred prize winning horses, sheep and cows. In addition, he was a dog breeder, and became known for his champion Irish wolfhounds.

Political career
In the years immediately after World War I, Corning collaborated with Daniel P. O'Connell to create a Democratic organization in Albany that could wrest control of the city from the Republican organization run by William Barnes Jr.; their strategy was to run wealthy non-ethnic Protestants like Edwin Corning, William Stormont Hackett, Parker Corning, and Erastus Corning 2nd for major offices including mayor and Congressman to enhance the respectability and credibility of a Democratic organization run by working class Irish-American, Catholic figures like O'Connell. Corning became chairman of the Albany County Democratic Committee in 1912 and chairman of the county committee's executive committee in 1919.  In the 1921 contest for mayor, the O'Connell/Corning organization succeeded in electing Hackett, the beginning of Democratic control of city hall that has remained in place ever since.

Corning was chairman of the New York State Democratic Committee from 1926 to 1928. He was Lieutenant Governor of New York from 1927 to 1928, elected on the Democratic ticket with Governor Alfred E. Smith in 1926. In 1928, when Smith planned to run for president, the Albany Democratic organization intended to run Hackett for governor.  After Hackett's death in a car accident, Corning considered making the campaign, but declined because of ill health.  After his term as lieutenant governor he retired from his business and political interests.

Personal life
On November 25, 1908, he married Louise Maxwell, who was born to American parents in Cawnpore, India, where her father was serving as a missionary. Together, Louise and Edwin were the parents of:

 Erastus Corning 2nd (1909–1983), who served as Mayor of Albany for over 40 years.
 Louise Corning (1911–1954), who married Andrew Hamilton Ransom.
 Harriet Corning (1916–1966), who married Wharton Sinkle Jr. (1914–1953) in 1937. She later married Samuel E. Ewing.
 Edwin Corning Jr. (1919–1964), who was serving in the New York State Assembly when he was involved in a 1959 car accident. He resigned his Assembly seat, and died without recovering fully.

He died on a hospital operating table in Bar Harbor, Maine, during a second leg amputation, which was necessary because of gangrene derived from diabetes. He was buried at the Albany Rural Cemetery in Menands, New York.

References

External links
Political Graveyard
Bio at NY History, USGenNet

1883 births
1934 deaths
Lieutenant Governors of New York (state)
New York (state) Democrats
Politicians from Albany, New York
Burials at Albany Rural Cemetery
Groton School alumni
Yale University alumni
Deaths from diabetes
20th-century American politicians
The Albany Academy alumni
Corning family